{{Infobox military conflict
|conflict=Siege of 's-Hertogenbosch (1601)
|partof=the Eighty Years' War and the Anglo-Spanish War (1585–1604)
|image='s-Hertogenbosch belegerd door Maurits, 1601, RP-P-OB-80.601.jpg
|image_size=300px
|caption=Map of the siege of 's-Hertogenbosch by Simon Frisius.
|date= 1–27 November 1601
|place='s-Hertogenbosch, North Brabant(present-day the Netherlands)
| coordinates = 
| map_type    = Netherlands#Europe without the extreme north
| map_relief  = yes 
| map_size    = 
| map_marksize = 
| map_caption = 
| map_label   = 
| map_mark =
| casus       = 
| territory   = 
|result= Spanish victory<ref name=" Van Nimwegen p. 179">[https://books.google.com/books?id=WYMycUTDDiwC&q=Siege+of+%27s-Hertogenbosch+1601%27%27The&pg=PA176 Dutch Army and the Military Revolutions 1588–1688.] Van Nimwegen p.179</ref>
|combatant1=
|combatant2= Spain
|commander1= Maurice of Nassau William Louis of Nassau-Dillenburg
|commander2= Anthonie Schetz Frederik van den Bergh
|strength1=12,000–15,00022 guns
|strength2=Anthonie Schetz: 2 infantry companies and 2 cavalry companiesFrederik van den Bergh: 7,000 infantry and 1,500 cavalry
|casualties1=
|casualties2=
|campaignbox=

}}

The siege of 's-Hertogenbosch of 1601 (Sitio de Bolduque de 1601 in Spanish) was an unsuccessful Dutch attempt led by Prince Maurice of Nassau and William Louis of Nassau-Dillenburg to capture the city of 's-Hertogenbosch, North Brabant, Spanish Netherlands, garrisoned by about 1,500–2,000 Spanish soldiers (2 infantry companies and 2 cavalry companies) led by Governor Anthonie Schetz, Baron of Grobbendonck, between 1 and 27 November 1601, during the Eighty Years' War and the Anglo-Spanish War (1585–1604), in the context of the long and bloodiest siege of Ostend.

After having captured Rheinberg in July 1601, Prince Maurice in October mobilized seventy-three companies of infantry and thirty-three companies of cavalry, including several pieces of artillery. The city was virtually impregnable due to the great defensive fortifications, the continuous arrival of fresh Spanish reinforcements, and the deep loyalty of the population to the Catholic cause. The fierce cold was another important point. The siege ended when the Archduke Albert, Governor-General of the Spanish Netherlands, sent a Spanish relief force under Count Frederik van den Bergh from Ostend, who on 27 November had reached the town of Oirschot, some 25 km south of 's-Hertogenbosch. A day before, on 26 November, Prince Maurice, according with his cousin William Louis about the threat and danger to facing the Spaniards in open field, started the withdrawal.Van Nimwegen p.179

This Dutch failure was also an attempt to weaken the Spanish attacks in Ostend, where Sir Francis Vere (the commander of the garrison of Ostend at that time) was by now close to despair.

In 1603, Maurice of Nassau again tried to conquer 's-Hertogenbosch, but again was forced to withdraw.Daniel Coetzee p.118

See also
 Battle of Nieuwpoort
 Siege of Ostend
 Siege of Lingen (1605)
 List of Governors of the Spanish Netherlands

Notes

References
 Van Nimwegen, Olaf. The Dutch Army and the Military Revolutions 1588–1688. First published 2010. The Boydell Press, Woodbridge. 
 Michiel Verweij. Petrus Vladeraccus, Tobias (1598). Leuven University Press 2001. Belgium. 
 Tracy, James. The Founding of the Dutch Republic: War, Finance, and Politics in Holland 1572–1588. Oxford University Press. First published 2008. 
 Daniel Coetzee/ Lee W. Eysturlid. Philosophers of War: The Evolution of History's Greatest Military Thinkers. 
 Williams, Penry (1998). The Later Tudors: England, 1547-1603. Oxford University Press. .
 John Lothrop Motley. History of the Netherlands, 1595. Chapter XXXI. HardPress Publishing. 
 Peter Burke. The New Cambridge Modern History: Volume 13, Companion Volume''. Cambridge University Press 1979.

External links
 Campaña de 1601 by Juan L. Sánchez 

Hertogenbosch
1601 in the Dutch Republic
1601 in the Habsburg Netherlands
17th-century military history of the Kingdom of England
17th-century military history of Spain
Hertogenbosch (1601)
Eighty Years' War (1566–1609)
Hertogenbosch (1601)
Hertogenbosch (1601)
Hertogenbosch (1601)
Hertogenbosch (1601)
Hertogenbosch
Events in 's-Hertogenbosch